USS Salamonie (AO-26) was a Cimarron-class fleet replenishment oiler, named for the Salamonie River in Indiana.

Salamonie was laid down on 5 February 1940 under a Maritime Commission contract (MC hull 13) as Esso Columbia by the Newport News Shipbuilding and Drydock Company, Newport News, Virginia.; launched on 18 September 1940; sponsored by Mrs. Eugene Holman; designated for US Navy use on 20 November 1940; and commissioned on 28 April 1941.

Service history

World War II
After runs to various North American Atlantic Ocean ports, Salamonie got underway for her first overseas mission on 13 November 1942 in a large convoy headed for Casablanca, North Africa. Then, after several convoys to the United Kingdom the oiler was overhauled in Norfolk, Virginia, and fitted with radar.

On 12 February 1943 in the North Atlantic Salamonie suffered a steering fault and accidentally rammed the troopship USAT Uruguay amidships. The tanker's bow made a  hole in Uruguays hull and penetrated her hospital, killing 13 soldiers and injuring 50. One soldier landed on the tanker's deck, where he was not discovered until Salamonie had changed course to Bermuda for repairs.
 
Salamonie sailed for the Pacific Ocean via the Panama Canal on 8 July 1944 and reported for duty to Commander Service Force, US 7th Fleet, at Milne Bay, New Guinea, on 23 August. Salamonie joined the Leyte invasion force in Hollandia on 8 October 1944 and later supported both the Morotai and Mindoro strike forces. She spent the final months of the war supporting Allied operations in the Philippines.
 
The sole war casualty on Salamonie was caused by a strafing run by a single Japanese plane on 5 January 1945.
 
Following the formal Japanese surrender, the oiler provided logistic services to the Shanghai occupation forces along the Huangpu River.

Post-war
Early in 1946 Salamonie returned to California for an overhaul at Long Beach Naval Shipyard; then sailed back across the Pacific. The next two and a half years were spent shuttling petroleum products between Bahrain in the Persian Gulf and United States naval bases in the Far East.
 
After returning to Long Beach, California in December 1948, Salamonie was assigned to the US Atlantic Fleet and arrived at Norfolk in May 1949. Western Atlantic and Caribbean operations with the US 2nd Fleet and deployments with the US 6th Fleet in the Mediterranean Sea took the oiler through the 1950s and well into the 1960s.

In August and September 1958 Salamonie was part of Navy Task Force 88 (TF-88), during Operation Argus, which was involved in conducting nuclear tests in the very high atmosphere.

Toward the end of the 1960s she was designated for inactivation. Placed in reserve on 23 August 1968 and decommissioned on 20 December, Salamonie's name was struck from the Navy List on 2 September 1969. She was transferred permanently to the Maritime Administration and laid up in the James River, where she remained until 24 September 1970 when her hulk was sold to N. U. Intershitra of Rotterdam, Netherlands, for scrapping.

References

External links
 
 Official Website

 

1940 ships
Cimarron-class oilers (1939)
Cold War auxiliary ships of the United States
Maritime incidents in February 1943
Ships built in Newport News, Virginia
World War II auxiliary ships of the United States
World War II tankers of the United States